Slevin's bunchgrass lizard (Sceloporus slevini) is a species of lizard in the family Phrynosomatidae. The species is indigenous to the  southwestern United States and adjacent northern Mexico.

Taxonomy and etymology
Described in 1937 by Hobart M. Smith, the species was named after the collector of the holotype specimen, Joseph R. Slevin.

Geographic range
In the United States, S. slevini is found in southeastern Arizona. In Mexico, it is found in Chihuahua, northern Durango, northeastern Sinaloa, and eastern Sonora.

Habitat
The preferred natural habitats of S. slevini are grassland and forest.

Description
The rows of lateral scales on the sides of the body are parallel to the rows of dorsal scales. The rows of femoral pores are separated at the midline by not more than two scales.

Reproduction
S. slevini is oviparous.

References

Further reading
Jones LLC, Lovich RE (editors)(2009). Lizards of the American Southwest: A Photographic Field Guide. Tucson, Arizona: Rio Nuevo Publishers. 568 pp. . (Sceloporus slevini, pp. 513–514).
Tanner WW (1987). "Lizards and Turtles of Western Chihuahua". Great Basin Naturalist 47: 383–421. (Sceloporus slevini, new status, pp. 400–401).

Sceloporus
Reptiles described in 1937
Lizards of North America
Fauna of the Southwestern United States
Reptiles of the United States
Reptiles of Mexico
Taxa named by Hobart Muir Smith